Ron Hanks is an American politician who served in the Colorado House of Representatives from 2021 to early 2023. A member of the Republican Party, Hanks represented District 60. Hanks generated controversy on numerous occasions, most notably for his participation in the 2021 United States Capitol attack. Hanks ran for the U.S. Senate in a bid to challenge Michael Bennet in 2022 but lost in the primary.

Background
Hanks served for 32 years (active and reserve) in the United States Air Force. He lives in Cañon City, Colorado and owns a company called The Western Surveyor.

Political career 
In 2010, Hanks ran unsuccessfully for Congress in Northern California. Hanks was later elected to the Colorado House of Representatives in the 2020 general election.
In the June 2020 Republican house district 60 primary, he ran unopposed.

In the 2020 general election, Hanks won 62.41% of the total votes cast.

In 2020 Joe Biden defeated Donald Trump, winning the 2020 presidential election. Hanks has questioned the election results and promoted false claims of election fraud in the 2020 presidential election.

In April 2021, Hanks was criticized for joking about lynching and claiming the Three-Fifths Compromise that designated a slave as three-fifths of a person "was not impugning anybody’s humanity." Hanks claimed his statements were manipulated to make a point he wasn't making.

In May 2021, Hanks threatened to assault Colorado House Minority Leader and fellow Republican Hugh McKean over a legislative disagreement.

In June 2021, Hanks visited Arizona to observe the controversial Arizona audit. The next month, Hanks participated in a conference hosted by MyPillow CEO Mike Lindell, known for promoting false claims of fraud in the 2020 presidential election.

In August 2021, Hanks attended a rally in Mesa County to support Tina Peters, a local Republican county clerk who was affiliated with groups promoting false claims of election fraud and was later arrested and indicted for seven felony charges related to election tampering and misconduct. Hanks said that the clerk was a "gold star mom and public servant. There is no evidence she did anything wrong". Hanks also accused the investigation of the clerk's office of being a "false-flag operation" despite a lack of evidence or substantiation of these claims.

On October 1, 2021, Hanks filed to run for the U.S. Senate in a bid to challenge Michael Bennet in 2022. Howwver, in the 2022 Republican primary election for United States Senator from Colorado, Joe O'Dea defeated Hanks and one write-in candidate.

2021 U.S. Capitol attack 

Hanks participated in the January 6, 2021, attack on the United States Capitol, saying that "people had already entered the building" by the time he arrived at a designated meeting area. In a fundraising newsletter, Hanks continued to promote conspiracy theories regarding the certification of the 2020 election. He said of the crowd, “It seems more likely that there were people who intended to blend in to the group, then create mayhem and blame it on Trump supporters.” He said, "This isn’t just an economic system or policy priorities we are arguing about. There is a nuclear and national security aspect to this election that must not fall into the hands of foreign enemies or their domestic agents." Such claims have been debunked by multiple sources.

References

External links
Legislative website
Campaign website

21st-century American politicians
Candidates in the 2022 United States Senate elections
Protesters in or near the January 6 United States Capitol attack
Living people
Republican Party members of the Colorado House of Representatives
People from Fremont County, Colorado
Year of birth missing (living people)